Laage is an Amt in the district of Rostock, in Mecklenburg-Vorpommern, Germany. The seat of the Amt, that was formed in 2004, is in the town Laage.

The Amt Laage consists of the following municipalities:
Dolgen am See
Hohen Sprenz
Laage
Wardow

References

Ämter in Mecklenburg-Western Pomerania
Rostock (district)